Doumen District is a district of Zhuhai, Guangdong Province, China. Doumen town is the home of the Zhaozhen Museum, named after U.S. Army Colonel, John C. Young (Chinese: 容兆珍), whose father was born near there.

Subdistricts

Climate

References 

County-level divisions of Guangdong
Zhuhai